Francisco Terra Alberoni or simply Alberoni, (born May 16, 1984 in Niterói) is a Brazilian football player.

Career
Alberoni began playing football in his country at Vasco da Gama. In January 2003, he was signed by Italian side Internazionale Milano and played six months for its Primavera team (U-20 youth team). For season 2003-04 he was loaned to Brescia Calcio. After the end of the season he returned to Brazil, signing with Esporte Clube Bahia. From July 2004 to December 2004 Alberoni was a part of the second team of FC Barcelona. After that he played for a few clubs, including Argentine Independiente and Spanish UD Las Palmas and Deportivo Alavés. In 2009 Alberoni played 8 matches for Duque de Caxias RJ. In December 2009 Alberoni signed a one-a-half year contract with Bulgarian Slavia Sofia. He remained with the "whites" until August 2010. His stay in Bulgaria was plagued by injury problems.

International 
In 2001 Alberoni was a member of the Brazil U17 team at the  South American Championship U17, in Peru. In the same year he also played at the World Cup U-17 in Trinidad and Tobago. Alberoni scored a goal in the quarterfinal against France U17.

References

External links

 Player profile at futbolmercado.es
 Alberoni at ZeroZero

1984 births
Living people
Brazilian footballers
Brazilian expatriate footballers
Association football midfielders
CR Vasco da Gama players
Brescia Calcio players
Esporte Clube Bahia players
Club Atlético Independiente footballers
U.D. Leiria players
UD Las Palmas players
Deportivo Alavés players
Botafogo de Futebol e Regatas players
PFC Slavia Sofia players
Agremiação Sportiva Arapiraquense players
Serie A players
First Professional Football League (Bulgaria) players
Expatriate footballers in Italy
Expatriate footballers in Argentina
Expatriate footballers in Spain
Expatriate footballers in Portugal
Expatriate footballers in Bulgaria
Brazilian expatriate sportspeople in Bulgaria
Sportspeople from Niterói